St. Marguerite d'Youville Secondary School (often referred to as d'Youville or abbreviated to d'Y) is a school in the Dufferin-Peel Catholic District School Board (DPCDSB). It is a Catholic high school located in Brampton, Ontario, Canada.

Location
This school located at 10815 Dixie Road North in Brampton was built in 2002 and opened for classes in September 2002. It replaced an older, smaller facility at 115 Glenvale Boulevard the school was previously located at.

The old school building, today a holding school location known as the "Glenvale Campus", began construction in 1975. It was originally occupied by St. Thomas Aquinas SS from September 1976 until they moved into a new larger school building nearby in 1992. After, Robert F. Hall CSS students that previously attended Notre Dame CSS occupied it from September 1992 until their new building in Caledon was complete. St. Marguerite d'Youville CSS was formed and commenced classes at the Glenvale location starting in September 1995, and continued to reside there until the end of the 2001/2002 school year. By this time, the small two level building was at capacity, with students being bussed in to the location from other parts of Brampton, numerous portables providing additional classroom space, and the potential for even more school enrollment as Brampton continued to expand to the north.

Back in 1999, the DPCDSB initially considered a plan with the public board to include St. Marguerite d'Youville (then searching for a new site) in a dual-school campus in the Springdale community. It would have been the first of five such facilities planned, in order to save on the costs of building new separate school facilities, according to studies conducted in 1997. This campus would have included both public and catholic schools using shared facilities, and also a community centre and park, and was to be located at the intersection of Sandalwood Parkway and Dixie Road. A number of student, security, vehicular congestion and school rivalry concerns were brought up with the plan, and it was ultimately voted down by Brampton's planning board in January 2000. Then-Mayor Peter Robertson called for the Ontario Education Minister to intervene, and accused the DPCDSB of bailing out due to a possible loss of identity on a campus with a public school. A representative from the DPCDSB however citied concerns with the pressing issue of overcrowding at their existing schools, and the ability of the board to build a new school on a separate site to the north quicker on their own than in a joint venture, which would take an extra year or longer to design and build.

Ultimately, a new building was built to house St. Marguerite d'Youville on the proposed northerly site, on the east side of Dixie Road North between Sandalwood Parkway and Countryside Drive. It was expected to accommodate roughly ~1500 students from the growing north central Brampton area. Initially the new Dixie Road building was on the outer reaches of development in Brampton in the Springdale community, but over the next few years more and more surrounding farmland was developed into residential neighbourhoods and public transit access was improved. As time went on, enrollment from the surrounding area increased and a number of portables were added to the new school grounds, on the east side of the building where a small field was.

Father Tobin Road, located to the immediate north of the current building, was named after a longtime Chaplain and Priest at the school, Father Tobin, who retired at the end of the 2002/2003 school year. At first it was a small section of road stretching east from Dixie and ending past the north roadway entrance, just north of the track field. As the surrounding farmland was redeveloped into residential neighbourhoods, it was extended east and now reaches Mountainash Road.

When the school opened, Brampton Transit was contracted to provide a special bus service (Route 87 d'Youville school special) before and after school for students between Trinity Common Mall and the Dixie Road building. This was phased out when further development in the area warranted the extension of the Route 18 Dixie bus service from Octillo Blvd to Father Tobin Road in 2007. School bus routes were briefly offered to students coming from neighbourhoods further away (i.e. the Torbram and Bovaird area, and Castlemore) with the exception of the school busses being cut off in 2014.

Facilities
Facilities include:
 130-seat theater
 Triple gymnasium
 Full weight room
 Library
 Chapel
 Cafeteria (nicknamed the "cafetorium" because of its partial auditorium) and Servery
 Shop area for wood and metalworking
 Dance studio
 Various classrooms specially equipped as cosmetics, science and computer labs
 Greenhouse room
 Track field with soccer goals
 3 separate parking lots (one typically for teachers only)

Programs and extracurriculars

A popular extra-curricular that carried over from the late 1990s at the old location was d'Youville Drama. 4-6 plays featuring students were put on per year, split between the Winter and Summer terms and directed by either teachers or students. Rehearsals were done over a number of months, culminating in performances for school students during drama week and ending with a Friday night Wine & Cheese gala presentation for parents. Various musicals, comedies, movies, classic works, TV and film adaptations have been put on by students over the years. In the old Glenvale location, performances were held in the gym. At the new Dixie location, they are usually performed at the theatre (previously named "The Globe on Dixie", now renamed "The Panther's Playhouse", decorated with numerous posters for past plays).

The d'Youville DECA student group was founded at the beginning of the 2004/2005 school year, composed of 18 students studying business and business-related areas. In its first year of competitions two finalists placed in the provincials, and went on to represent the school in the annual national DECA ICDC in Anaheim, California.

Sports teams have always been popular at d'Youville, including soccer, basketball and football under the d'Youville Panthers banner.

There is a Specialist High School Major (SHSM) program offered for Health Care, Child Care and Sports.

Notable alumni
 Tristan Thompson, basketball player
 Kenny Ejim, basketball player
 Nakas Onyeka, Canadian football player
 Ayo Akinola, Canadian football player currently playing for Toronto FC

See also
List of high schools in Ontario

References

High schools in Brampton
Catholic secondary schools in Ontario
Educational institutions established in 1995
1995 establishments in Ontario